The Academy of Architecture can refer to:
 Académie d'architecture
 Académie royale d'architecture
 
 Academy of Architecture (Rotterdam)
 International Academy of Architecture

See also 
 Academia Mexicana de Arquitectura
 Donbas National Academy of Civil Engineering and Architecture
 National Academy of Visual Arts and Architecture
 Russian Academy of Architecture and Construction Sciences
 Ural State Academy of Architecture and Arts